Uniemyśl may refer to the following places in Poland:
 Uniemyśl, Lower Silesian Voivodeship
 Uniemyśl, West Pomeranian Voivodeship